DKZ (formerly Dongkiz; , stylized in all caps) is a South Korean boy band formed and managed by Dongyo Entertainment. The group comprises Kyoungyoon, Sehyeon, Mingyu, Jaechan, Jonghyeong, and Giseok, and previously Wondae and Munik until they departed from the group in March 2022 and February 2023, respectively.

History

2018: Predebut
The members of Dongkiz—Wondae, Kyoungyoon, Munik, Jaechan, and Jonghyeong—were trainees between one and three years. The group was modeled after New Kids on the Block.

Dongkiz initiated promotional activities in August 2018, which included uploading dance covers onto Dongyo Entertainment's YouTube channel and busking. They also performed at the HEC Korea Concert in Thailand and attended the 2018 JOOX Thailand Music Awards.

On November 21, 2018, the group released a Minneapolis sound-based pre-debut single entitled "Nom".

2019–2021: Career beginnings 

Originally slated for a February 2019 debut, Dongkiz released their debut single album Dongkiz on the Block on April 24. They intended to promote a different song, but ultimately decided on "Nom" to serve as the lead single. On July 22, the group released their second single album BlockBuster. The title track samples the theme song of the 1984 film Ghostbusters. Dedicated to their fans, they released the dance-pop track "Dreaming You" as a digital single on September 11. After sustaining a leg injury in midst of practice, in addition to ongoing trauma from a back injury endured prior to his debut, Kyoungyoon paused his activities to recuperate and the group continued promoting as four. Dongkiz released their first mini-album Dongky Town and accompanying disco-EDM single "Fever" on November 6. They went on to win the "Focus Award (Music)" at the 2019 Asia Artist Awards held at Mỹ Đình National Stadium in Hanoi, Vietnam. The group was also invited to perform by the Korean Cultural Center in Turkey on December that year.

On January 2, 2020, Dongkiz followed up with the funk single "All I Need Is You", marking Kyoungyoon's return to the group. The group released the old-school hip hop-dance single "Lupin" on March 15. Dongkiz's third single album Ego was released on August 19, 2020. On December 30, the group released  "It's All Right" on their official social networking sites. The song was their first year-end project song which was written, composed, and arranged by all five members of the group.

Dongkiz's fourth single album Youniverse was released on April 15, 2021.  It was then followed by the release of their fifth single album Chase Episode 1. Ggum with "Crazy Night" as its single on July 1. In August that year, Dongkiz was again invited for a K-pop concert in Ankara, Turkey hosted by the Korean Cultural Center, and Dongyo Entertainment announced that Wondae and Munik will be taking hiatus from group activities. On December 30, 2021, Kyoungyoon, Jaechan, and Jonghyeong released their second year-end project song, "2021 (Memories)".

2022: Rebranding and rising popularity

On March 18, Dongyo Entertainment announced Wondae's departure from the group due to ongoing health issues while Munik will remain with the group but stay on indefinite hiatus due to medical issues. The agency also revealed its plans to rebrand Dongkiz by changing its name to DKZ and adding three new members to its lineup.  On March 28, Sehyeon, Mingyu, and Giseok were introduced as new members of the group.  The group released their sixth single album Chase Episode 2. Maum with "Cupid" as its single on April 12. A limited-edition acoustic version of the same album was released on May 26, which was sold out minutes after the server was restored when it initially crashed during  release.

The group attended and performed at the K-Expo 2022 in Sao Paulo, Brazil. Hosted by the Korean Cultural Center in Brazil, DKZ was the only K-pop idol group invited to perform at the country's largest Hallyu cultural festival held on July 9th and 10th.

On September 2, they were recognized and given the "Male Idol - Rising Star Award" in the 2022 Brand of the Year Awards organized by the Korea Consumer Forum.

On October 6, the group released their seventh single album and the last one for their Chase Album Trilogy - Chase Episode 3. Beum with "Uh-Heung" as its single. While they are promoting for their comeback, DKZ performed in the Ariake Arena in Tokyo, Japan on October 15 for KCON 2022 as the first gen winner of MNET Plus' Road to Max: Road to KCON. On October 18, DKZ gained their first music show award during promotions for "Uh-Heung" on the SBS M's The Show.

In November, DKZ performed at the 2022 Genie Music Awards and was chosen to be the recipient of the "Next Generation Award".  Prior to that, the group was announced as the honorary winner of the final episode of MNET Plus' Road to Max: Road to MAMA Awards. As its winning prize, on November 29, the group attended and performed at the 2022 MAMA Awards held at the Kyocera Dome in Osaka, Japan.

Before the year 2022 ended, the group released their self-produced digital album, "DKZ Year End Project Song 'It's All Right Part.3'" with their single "2022 (Forever)" on December 30.

2023–present: First fan-con and Munik's departure 
The group held its first live fan concert since their debut, "Welcome to DTU (Dongky Town University)", on January 14 and 15, 2023 in SK Olympic Handball Gymnasium. The 2-day concert was also simultaneously broadcast live for a fee through an online platform.

On February 28, Dongyo Entertainment announced the departure of Munik from the group. In addition, DKZ will continue promoting as a 6-member boy group.

Members

Current 
 Kyoungyoon – vocals
 Sehyeon
 Mingyu
 Jaechan – vocals, rap
 Jonghyeong – leader, vocals
 Giseok

Former 
 Wondae – leader, vocals, rap
 Munik – vocals

Timeline

Sub-units

DONGKIZ I:KAN 
On July 7, 2020, members Munik and Jaechan debuted as a sub-unit called DONGKIZ I:KAN (or simply I:Kan, stylized in all caps).  They released a new jack swing single "Y.O.U".

Ambassadorship and philanthropy 
During their pre-debut, the group performed at the Charity Concert for Palu, Sigi, and Donggala held in Jakarta, Indonesia. The proceeds of the charity performance were donated to the victims of Indonesia's 2018 Sulawesi earthquake and tsunami.

Since November 5, 2019, the group has been appointed as the PR ambassador for the "S.A.V.E. Campaign" jointly launched by the Bestian Foundation and the Fire Department of South Korea. DKZ has been continuously promoting the campaign to improve the welfare of firefighters in the Republic of Korea and support the treatment and recovery of low-income burn patients.

On March 2, 2020, the members were selected as ambassadors for the Korea Science and Space Agency (YAK), a youth organization under the jurisdiction of the Ministry of Science and ICT.

Artistry
They have cited BTS as their role models.

Discography

Extended plays

Single albums

Singles

Compilation appearances

Soundtrack appearances

Videography

Music videos

Filmography

Web shows

Television shows

Television series

Web series

Awards and nominations

Notes

References

External links

 

2019 establishments in South Korea
K-pop music groups
Musical groups established in 2019
Musical groups from Seoul
South Korean boy bands
South Korean dance music groups